Elisabeth Wendt (11 January 1906 – 24 March 1980) was a German film actress. After making her debut in Georg Wilhelm Pabst's Comradeship (1931), she appeared mostly in supporting roles during the Nazi era and immediate post-Second World War years.

Partial filmography

 Comradeship (1931) - Frau Anna Wittkopp
 Theodor Körner (1932)
 The First Right of the Child (1932)
 Sacred Waters (1932)
 Impossible Love (1932) - Katharina Steinkampp, seine Frau
 Die vom Niederrhein (1933) - Bettina Wittelsbach
 Mother and Child (1934) - Frau Petersen
 Hanneles Himmelfahrt (1934) - Hete
 Stradivárius (1935)
 Ein seltsamer Gast (1936) - Lou
 The Hour of Temptation (1936) - Alice - seine Frau
 The Grey Lady (1937) - Lola
 On Leave but Still on Duty (1938) - Lulu Frey
 Frau Sylvelin (1938) - Fräulein Brunner
 The Stars Shine (1938) - Lisa Marwen
 Mordsache Holm (1938) - Jenny Nerger, seine Frau
 Men, Animals and Sensations (1938) - Maja de Passy
 Der vierte kommt nicht (1939) - Frau Elle Fredmark
 Die Hochzeitsreise (1939) - Countess Amelie Zuurmondt
 Die fremde Frau (1939) - Jouka
 Schneewittchen und die sieben Zwerge (1939) - Königin
 My Life for Ireland (1941) - Nora Mullins
 The Green Salon (1944) - Lieselotte, seine Frau
 Die Buntkarierten (1949)
 Girls Behind Bars (1949) - Else Richnow, 'Bohnenstange'
 Dr. Semmelweis (1950) - 2. Krankenschwester
 The Staircase (1950) - Frau Görisch
 Ave Maria (1953) - Lisa Nilsson

References

Bibliography 
 Eisner, Lotte. The Haunted Screen: Expressionism in the German Cinema and the Influence of Max Reinhardt. University of California Press, 2008.

External links 
 

1906 births
1980 deaths
German film actresses
Actors from Cologne
20th-century German actresses